| matches             = 17
| goals               = 50
| top goal scorer     =  Jozy Altidore
| prevseason          = 2015
| nextseason          = 2017
}}

The 2016 MLS Cup Playoffs (branded as the 2016 Audi MLS Cup Playoffs for sponsorship reasons) began on October 26, and ended on December 10 with MLS Cup 2016, the 21st league championship match for MLS. This was the 21st version of the MLS Cup Playoffs, the tournament culminating the Major League Soccer regular season.

Twelve teams (the top 6 per conference) competed. The first round of each conference had the third-seeded team hosting the sixth seed while the fourth-seed hosted the fifth in a single match to determine who advanced to the Conference Semifinals. In the Conference Semifinals, the top seed played the lowest remaining seed while the second played the next-lowest. The winners advanced to the Conference Finals. Both the Conference Semifinals and Conference Finals were played as two-legged aggregate series. The winners advanced to the MLS Cup, a single match hosted by the participant with the better record.

Seattle Sounders FC defeated Toronto FC 5–4 on penalties to win their first ever MLS Cup. The game ended scoreless after extra time.

It was the first MLS Cup in league history that two expansion teams participated in the final. It was also the first time in the league's history that a Canadian MLS team competed in the MLS Cup.

Conference standings
The top 6 teams from each conference advance to the MLS Cup playoffs. Green background denotes also qualified for 2018 CONCACAF Champions League.

Eastern Conference

Western Conference

Bracket

Knockout round

Summary

|-
|colspan="5" bgcolor=#87CEFA align=center|Eastern Conference

|-
|colspan="5" bgcolor=#FFAEB9 align=center|Western Conference

|}

Matches

Conference semifinals

Summary

|-
|colspan="5" bgcolor=#87CEFA|Eastern Conference

|-
|colspan="5" bgcolor=#FFAEB9|Western Conference

|}

Matches

Toronto FC won 7–0 on aggregate.

Montreal Impact won 3–1 on aggregate.

1–1 on aggregate. Colorado Rapids won 3–1 on penalties.

Seattle Sounders FC won 4–2 on aggregate.

Conference Finals

Summary

|-
|colspan="5" bgcolor=#87CEFA|Eastern Conference

|-
|colspan="5" bgcolor=#FFAEB9|Western Conference

|}

Matches

Toronto FC won 7–5 on aggregate.

Seattle Sounders FC won 3–1 on aggregate.

MLS Cup

Top goalscorers

References

2016 Major League Soccer season
MLS Cup Playoffs
MLS Cup Playoffs
MLS Cup Playoffs